Attorney General Martin may refer to:

Clarrie Martin (1900–1953), Attorney General of New South Wales
Crawford Martin (1916–1972), Attorney General of Texas
Edward T. Martin (1910–1984), Attorney General of Massachusetts for sixteen days in 1967
Francois Xavier Martin (1762–1846), Attorney General of Louisiana
James Martin (premier) (1820–1886), Attorney General of New South Wales
John E. Martin (1891–1968), Attorney General of Wisconsin
Joseph Martin (Canadian politician) (1852–1923), Attorney General of Manitoba
Luther Martin (1748–1826), Attorney General of Maryland

See also
General Martin (disambiguation)